Insulin lispro, sold under the brand name Humalog among others, is a modified type of medical insulin used to treat type 1 and type 2 diabetes. It is used by injection under the skin or within an insulin pump. Onset of effects typically occurs within 30 minutes and lasts about 5 hours. Often a longer-acting insulin like insulin NPH is also needed.

Common side effects include low blood sugar. Other serious side effects may include low blood potassium. Use in pregnancy and breastfeeding is generally safe. It works the same as human insulin by increasing the amount of glucose that tissues take in and decreasing the amount of glucose made by the liver.

Insulin lispro was first approved for use in the United States in 1996. It is a manufactured form of human insulin where an amino acid has been switched. In 2020, it was the 71st most commonly prescribed medication in the United States, with more than 10million prescriptions.

Medical uses
Insulin lispro is used to treat people with type 1 diabetes or type 2 diabetes. People doing well on regular insulin should not generally be changed to insulin lispro.

Side effects
Common side effects include skin irritation at the site of injection, hypoglycemia, hypokalemia, and lipodystrophy. Other serious side effects include anaphylaxis, and hypersensitivity reactions.

Mechanism of action
Through recombinant DNA technology, the final lysine and proline residues on the C-terminal end of the B-chain are reversed. This modification does not alter receptor binding, but blocks the formation of insulin dimers and hexamers. This allows larger amounts of active monomeric insulin to be immediately available for postprandial injections.

Chemistry
It is a manufactured form of human insulin where the amino acids lysine and proline have been switched at the end of the B chain of the insulin molecule. This switch of amino acids mimics Insulin-like growth factor 1 which also has lysine (K) and proline (P) in that order at positions 27 and 28.

History
Insulin lispro (brand name Humalog) was granted marketing authorization in the European Union in April 1996, and it was approved for use in the United States in June 1996.

Insulin lispro (brand name Liprolog) was granted marketing authorization in the European Union in May 1997, and again in August 2001.

Combination drugs combining insulin lispro and other forms of insulin were approved for use in the United States in December 1999.

Insulin lispro Sanofi was granted marketing authorization as a biosimilar in the European Union in July 2017.

Insulin lispro injection (brand name Admelog) was approved for use in the United States in December 2017.

In January 2020, the Committee for Medicinal Products for Human Use (CHMP) in the European Union recommended granting of a marketing authorization for insulin lispro acid (brand name Lyumjev) for the treatment of diabetes mellitus in adults. Insulin lispro (Lyumjev) was approved for use in the European Union in March 2020, and in the United States on 18 June 2020 as reported by Medscape.

Society and culture

Economics 
The chief executive said that this was a contribution "to fix the problem of high out-of-pocket costs for Americans living with chronic conditions", but Patients for Affordable Drugs Now said this was just a public relations move, as "other countries pay  for a vial of insulin."

References

External links 
 

Diabetes
Eli Lilly and Company brands
Human proteins
Insulin receptor agonists
Insulin therapies
Peptide hormones
Recombinant proteins
Wikipedia medicine articles ready to translate
World Health Organization essential medicines

de:Insulinpräparat#Insulin lispro